Amanda Elzy High School (AEHS) is a high school in unincorporated Leflore County, Mississippi, south of Greenwood, and part of the Greenwood-Leflore Consolidated School District.

, it had 488 students in grades 9–12 and 36.37 teachers (full-time equivalent).

Its service area includes Minter City, Money, Sidon, and Schlater.

History
The school was named in 1959 in honor of Amanda Elzy, a pioneering black educator.

It was a part of the Leflore County School District until that district's merger into Greenwood-Leflore Consolidated School District on July 1, 2019.

Demographics
In the 20122013 school year, the demographic profile of the student body was 492 black students, 5 Hispanic students and 2 white students.

In 2014, its students were reported as 100% "economically disadvantaged."

Discipline
By 2010 the school began to only issue detentions for physical altercations, with a choice of either Saturdays or after school, instead of all day in-school suspensions.

Notable alumni

Lusia Harris (1955–2022), basketball player and member of the Women's Basketball Hall of Fame
Gerald Glass (born 1967), professional basketball player.  Glass attended Amanda Elzy High School as a student, and then returned as an adult to coach the basketball team to a state championship in the 2011–2012 season.
Alphonso Ford (1971–2004), basketball player
Leroy Jones (1950–2021), American football player

In popular culture
The school is mentioned frequently in Richard Rubin's book Confederacy of Silence.

References

External links
 

Public high schools in Mississippi
Schools in Leflore County, Mississippi